Sue Saville is an English television journalist, currently with ITN.

She joined ITN in May 1998, as a news correspondent on ITV News, after five years with GMTV, where she was Chief Correspondent.

She can now be seen as the Medical Correspondent for ITV News.

Career timeline
GMTV (Correspondent, 1993–1997)
BBC News at Six (Correspondent, 1999–2002)
ITV News (Correspondent, 2003 – present)

References

External links 

Living people
British television newsreaders and news presenters
English television journalists
English women journalists
ITN newsreaders and journalists
GMTV presenters and reporters
Year of birth missing (living people)
British women television journalists